Monica Raluca Sârghe is a Romanian football midfielder. She played in the Turkish Women's First League for the Turkish club Konak Belediyespor in Izmir.

Playing career
Sârghe performed athletics before she switched over to football playing. "This advantage makes her one of the fastest wingers in Europe" as noted in a Turkish newspaper.

Club

Sârghe played in the Romanian 1st League for Olimpia Cluj, She enjoyed twice her team's league champion title, and took part at the Champions League. She took part in three qualification and two knockout round matches of the 2011–12 UEFA Women's Champions League matches. Sârghe played in three qualifying matches and one knockout stage matches of the 2012–13 UEFA Women's Champions League, scoring one goal.

She later transferred to CFF Clujana. During her time, the time became five times league champion.

In November 2012, she moved together with her fellow countrywoman Cosmina Dușa to Turkey to join the Konak Belediyespor in Izmir, which played in the First league. Her team became four times in a row league champion between the 2012–13 and 2015–16 seasons. Sârghe took part in six matches of the 2013–14 UEFA Women's Champions League, in three mathes of the 2014–15 UEFA Women's Champions League qualifying round and three matches of the 2016–17 UEFA Women's Champions League qualifying round, and scored two goals in total. At the 2017–18 UEFA Women's Champions League qualifying round in Tbilisi, Georgia, she played in two of the three matches for her team.

International
She is a member of the Romanian national team, and served as their captain.

In 2010 and 2011, she played in four matches of the 2011 FIFA Women's World Cup qualification – UEFA Group 4, and scored one goal.

She participated at the UEFA Women's Euro 2013 qualifying – Group 2, capping in all ten matches and scoring one goal.

In 2013 and 2014, she appeared in ten matches for the national team at the 2015 FIFA Women's World Cup qualification – UEFA Group 2, and scored one goal.

Career statistics
.

Honours
 Turkish Women's First Football League
 Konak Belediyespor
 Winners (5): 2012–13, 2013–14, 2014–15, 2015–16, 2016–17
 Third places (1): 2017–18

References

External links

Living people
1987 births
Romanian women's footballers
Romania women's international footballers
Konak Belediyespor players
Romanian expatriate footballers
Romanian expatriate sportspeople in Turkey
Expatriate women's footballers in Turkey
Women's association football midfielders
FCU Olimpia Cluj players
CFF Clujana players